Thomas Rowland (1784 – August 13, 1849) was an American politician and soldier who served as the third Secretary of State for the State of Michigan. He was the first and only Whig Secretary of State for Michigan.

Thomas Rowland was born in 1784 in the town of Uniontown in Fayette, Pennsylvania. He died on August 13, 1849.

References 

1784 births
1849 deaths
Michigan politicians